is a 2010 Japanese psychological thriller film directed by Tetsuya Nakashima, based on author Kanae Minato's 2008 debut mystery novel that won the 2009 Honya Taisho award (Japan Booksellers Award). The film was both a commercial and critical success. It was awarded Best Picture at the 34th Japan Academy Prize and 53rd Blue Ribbon Awards and was shortlisted at the 83rd Academy Awards for Best Foreign Language Film.

Plot
Junior high school teacher Yuko Moriguchi (Takako Matsu) announces to her rowdy, disrespectful class that she will resign before spring break. She explains that because the HIV-positive father of her four-year-old daughter Manami was ill, she used to bring the girl to school with her. One day, Manami was found drowned in the school swimming pool. She explains that two students in her class, whom she dubs "Student A" and "Student B", had murdered her daughter. Yuko had found a small bunny purse among Manami's belongings which did not belong there, which led her to question Shuya Watanabe, one of her students. Shuya, Student A, immediately admitted to killing Manami, then mocked her compassionate reaction with, "Just kidding."

Having revealed their identities, Yuko explains that because the killers, as minors, are protected by the Juvenile Law of 1947, turning them in wouldn't make a difference. As a teacher, she believes she must teach them a lesson by making them amend for their mistakes. Yuko reveals she injected Manami's father's HIV-contaminated blood in the milk cartons of the two students she claims murdered Manami. The rest of the film switches between the aftermath of Yuko's confession and the events before the confession through first-person narratives from Yuko and three of her students. Naoki Shimomura, Student B, becomes a shut-in because he believes he has contracted AIDS from drinking the contaminated milk. His mother realizes her son was involved in Manami's death and decides to commit murder-suicide to free the both of them from their torment. However, in the ensuing struggle, Naoki kills his mother and the police arrest him. Meanwhile, Shuya explains that his mother abused him before leaving to pursue her scientific career. Her abandonment drove him to thrive in science, from making small inventions to recording his killing and dissecting of animals.

Shuya's first public invention, an electric anti-mugger wallet, earned him a science fair award, but failed to make headlines as the media was distracted by the "Lunacy Murder" case. He upgraded the anti-mugger wallet, decided to try it out on someone, and roped Naoki in to help. They decided to test the wallet on Yuko's daughter, but when they did so, the girl was rendered unconscious. Shuya mistook this as death. Enraged, Naoki threw Manami into the pool where she drowned, proving that he was the real killer. Classmate Mizuki Kitahara tells Shuya that she believes Yuko lied about the contaminated milk as it was an implausible method of transmission. Mizuki eventually confesses to him that she identifies with the girl in the "Lunacy Murder" case, who poisoned her parents. The two become romantically involved, but Shuya kills Mizuki after a confrontation over his abandonment complex.

Shuya visits the university where his mother works, expecting to reunite with her, but discovers she has remarried. Believing she has forgotten him, he plants a bomb in his school where the graduation ceremony is to be held and he is to give a speech. To his surprise, the bomb seemingly does not go off. Shuya then receives a call from Yuko, who says that she had relocated the bomb to his mother's office. She explains that it is her ultimate revenge, to let Shuya's mother die by his own hands, and claims that with her revenge completed, Shuya's path to redemption has begun. As the screen darkens, Yuko chuckles and says, "Just kidding."

Cast
 Takako Matsu as Yuko Moriguchi
 Masaki Okada as Yoshiteru Terada (Werther)
 Yoshino Kimura as Yuko Shimomura
 Yukito Nishii as Shuya Watanabe
 Kaoru Fujiwara as Naoki Shimomura
 Ai Hashimoto as Mizuki Kitahara
 Mana Ashida as Manami Moriguchi

Reception

Box office
Soon after the film had started showing in 266 cinemas, it had already grossed ¥269,835,200 with 194,893 audiences, breaking the record previously held by I Give My First Love to You. It kept grossing and became the highest grossing film for 4 consecutive weeks in June. It is ranked as the 7th highest-grossing Japanese film in 2010. The film also grossed $2,625,175 overseas in other Asian countries, bringing the worldwide total to $45,203,103.

Critical response
The film received a widespread positive response globally, with critics praising a variety of factors including good adaptation from the book, the director's style, and the acting, particularly by the child actors. The film holds an 81% 'fresh' average score at Rotten Tomatoes. Seongyong Cho of RogerEbert.com called it a "gut-chilling Japanese thriller". One notable negative review came from Mark Kermode of the BBC, who said that its style made it 'virtually impenetrable on an emotional level'.

Awards and nominations
The film was selected as the Japanese entry for the Best Foreign Language Film at the 83rd Academy Awards. In January 2011, it made the January shortlist and advanced to the next round of voting. In Japan, it firstly won Best Film and Best Supporting Actress at the 53rd Blue Ribbon Awards, which is one of the most prestigious national cinema awards in Japan. Then, it won the awards for Best Film, Best Director, Best Screenplay and Best Editor at the 34th Japan Academy Prize. Also, it had six nominations in 5th Asian Film Awards, which is one of the films with most nominations (with Let the Bullets Fly).

In April, the film won Best Asian Film (similar to Best Foreign Language Film, though only Asian films which have been screened in Hong Kong are admitted to join) at the 30th Hong Kong Film Awards. At the 31st Hong Kong Film Awards, the category of Best Asian Film was replaced by a new category called Best Film of Mainland and Taiwan which means that only Mainland Chinese and Taiwanese films can remain to compete for such an award. Therefore, Confessions has become the last winner of Best Asian Film.

See also
 List of submissions to the 83rd Academy Awards for Best Foreign Language Film
 List of Japanese submissions for the Academy Award for Best Foreign Language Film
 Sasebo slashing

References

External links

2010 drama films
2010 films
2010 thriller films
2010 thriller drama films
Films based on Japanese novels
Films directed by Tetsuya Nakashima
Japanese films about revenge
2010s Japanese-language films
Japanese nonlinear narrative films
Japanese thriller drama films
Picture of the Year Japan Academy Prize winners
2010s Japanese films